Alméras is a French surname. Notable people with the surname include:

Baron Louis Alméras (1768–1828) French general 
Henri Alméras (1892–1965) French perfumer for Patou
Jacques Alméras (born 1949), French racing driver
Jean-Marie Alméras (born 1943), French former racing driver
Alméras Frères, a racing team founded by brothers Jean-Marie and Jacques

See also
Antonio Fabré y Almerás (1728 ), Spanish monk

French-language surnames